Sima Eyvazova (2 October 1933 – 6 May 2009), was an Azerbaijani diplomat, first representative of the independent Republic at the United Nations Office in Geneve between 1994 and 1999.

Biography
Born in Baku, her father was doctor and studied Philology at the Baku State University.

She began to work at the age of 16 and at 23 worked in the Department of Agitation and Propaganda of the Central  Committee of the Communist Party of Azerbaijan during the Second Secretaryship of Vladimir Semichastny. At the age of 26, by decision of the Central Committee, she was sent to study at the Diplomatic Higher School in the Ministry of Foreign Affairs of the USSR, which graduated with honors.

Diplomat career
She has worked in the central office of the Ministry of Foreign Affairs of the USSR in the 2nd European Division, which deals with the relations of the Soviet Union to the United Kingdom, and in the external offices of the Ministry of Foreign Affairs - at the Soviet embassy in London and Sofia, as well as in the United Nations system at the UN Headquarters in New York, UN offices in Geneva and Vienna.

In 1982, the 1st Secretary of the Central Committee of the Communist Party of Azerbaijan, Heydar Aliyev, invited her to serve as Minister of Foreign Affairs of the Azerbaijani SSR.

From 1985 to 1993, she worked in a responsible position at the United Nations Office in Geneva.

Since January 1994, she has served as the permanent representative of Azerbaijan in the United Nations office in Geneva and other international organizations in Switzerland.

By decree of the President of the Republic of Azerbaijan, Heydar Aliyev, of March 4, 1997, was appointed to the UN Office in Geneva and other international organizations in Switzerland with the rank of Extraordinary and Plenipotentiary Ambassador.

She maintained friendly relations with other well-known diplomats from Azerbaijan, like Tahira Tahirova and Elmira Gafarova.

Sima Eyvazova became the first professional diplomat of the recent Republic of Azerbaijan, also the only non-Russian women of the former USSR who graduated from the Superior Diplomatic School of the Soviet Ministry of Foreign Affairs. In October 1991, while working at the UN office in Geneve, she resigned from the Soviet diplomatic service and registered as a citizen of an independent Republic of Azerbaijan, becoming the first employee in the history of the UN who had the Azerbaijani citizenship.

See also 

 Sabina Almammadova
 Khatira Bashirli
 Fəridə Vəzirova

References

1933 births
2009 deaths
Soviet women diplomats
Azerbaijan Communist Party (1920) politicians
Permanent Representatives of Azerbaijan to the United Nations
Baku State University alumni
Diplomatic Academy of the Ministry of Foreign Affairs of the Russian Federation alumni
Azerbaijani philologists
Azerbaijani women diplomats
Politicians from Baku
Soviet women in politics
21st-century Azerbaijani women politicians
21st-century Azerbaijani politicians
20th-century Azerbaijani women politicians
20th-century Azerbaijani politicians
Azerbaijani women ambassadors
20th-century philologists